A leaky feeder is a communications system used in underground mining and other tunnel environments.  Manufacturers and cabling professionals use the term "radiating cable" as this implies that the cable is designed to radiate: something that coaxial cable is not generally supposed to do.

Principle 
A leaky feeder communication system consists of a cable run along tunnels which emits and receives radio waves, functioning as an extended antenna. The cable is "leaky" in that it has gaps or slots in its outer conductor to allow the radio signal to leak into or out of the cable along its entire length. Because of this leakage of signal, line amplifiers are required to be inserted at regular intervals, typically every 350 to 500 metres, to boost the signal back up to acceptable levels. The signal is usually picked up by portable transceivers carried by personnel.  Transmissions from the transceivers are picked up by the feeder and carried to other parts of the tunnel, allowing two-way radio communication throughout the tunnel system.

The system has a limited range and because of the frequency it uses (typically VHF or UHF), transmissions cannot pass through solid rock, which limits the system to a line-of-sight application. It does, however, allow two-way mobile communication.

Due to the signal loss along the feeder, a leaky feeder is usually used for frequencies under 1 GHz. Above that frequency the losses require too many repeaters, thus making other options more effective. Antennas (omni, panel or bi-directional) or even Distributed antenna systems are more often used for higher frequency bands.

Applications

Mining 
Leaky feeders are used in the mining industry as a method of wireless communication between miners. The system is used as a primary communication system which has a transceiver small enough to be comfortably worn on a miner throughout an entire shift.

Underground railways 
The leaky feeder system is used for underground mobile communication in mass transit railways. In the Delhi Metro, rail transport systems of Hong Kong, and the Copenhagen Metro (Danish: CityRingen), leaky feeders were incorporated in the specification of the capital project and installed during construction. This gives emergency services seamless mobile communication from the underground to the surface.

London Underground uses a leaky feeder system for its internal communication network Connect. However, the communication used by the emergency services, Airwave, was not compatible and did not work below ground. The fact that this situation continued to exist after the 1987 King's Cross fire was criticized in the reports from the 7 July 2005 London bombings, where it hampered rescue efforts. In March 2020, two additional leaky feeder cables were brought online in the Jubilee line tunnels between Canning Town and Westminster. One of these cables provided commercial 4G coverage for passengers, both in the tunnels and on station platforms, whilst the second cable provided coverage for the Home Office's Emergency Services Network (ESN), which is currently being rolled out to replace the ageing Airwave network. This trial section is the first to be brought online as part of a project to provide both commercial 4G coverage and ESN coverage across the entire Tube network.

An alternative to using leaky feeder in underground railways is to use Distributed Antenna System (DAS). A DAS system was deployed in some New York City Subway stations by Transit Wireless to provide WiFi and mobile phone and data coverage for customers.

In-flight wireless networks 
Leaky feeder antenna system can also be used to allow reception of on-board GSM and WiFi signals on passenger aircraft. The weight and space requirements of leaky feeder systems are usually lower than comparable antenna systems, thus saving space and fuel. The even field strengths produced by runs of leaky feeders spanning the entire fuselage improve coverage while requiring less transmitting power.

Industrial buildings 
Leaky feeders are used in hotels, warehouses and other industrial buildings where it is difficult to get WiFi coverage using normal access points. Some installations have 50–75 meters of leaky wire connected to the antenna output of access points.

RFID 
Leaky feeders modified with metallic strips can be used as a Radio-frequency identification (RFID) antenna.

See also
 Tunnel transmitter
 Through the earth mine communications

References

External links
 IWT Wireless Communications and Tracking in Underground Mines - a wireless mesh alternative to leaky feeder

Antennas